Asymphorodes chalcozona is a moth of the family Agonoxenidae. It is found on Tahiti.

References

Moths described in 1934
Agonoxeninae
Moths of Oceania
Endemic fauna of French Polynesia